Nationality words link to articles with information on the nation's poetry or literature (for instance, Irish or France).

Events
 Christopher Smart writes "Jubilate Agno" (about 1758-63), only published in 1939

Works published

United Kingdom
 Mark Akenside, An Ode to the Country Gentlemen of England
 John Gilbert Cooper, The Call of Aristippus
 Robert Dodsley:
 Cleone: A tragedy, verse drama performed in December; the work also contains the author's poem "Melpomene", on the sublime
 Collection of Poems, volumes five and six
 James Macpherson, The Highlander
 Thomas Parnell, Posthumous Works

English, Colonial America
 Thomas Prince, The Psalms, Hymns, & spiritual Songs of the Old and new Testaments, English, Colonial America
 Annis Boudinot Stockton, "To the Honorable Colonel Peter Schuyler" published in New-York Mercury and New American Magazine; her first published poem; Colonial America

Other
 Anica Bošković, Dijalog Serbian published in Venice
 Solomon Gessner, Der Tod Abels, Switzerland, German-language work akin to an idyllic pastoral
Heyat Mahmud, Āmbiyābāṇī; Bengal, Bengali-language

Oliver Goldsmith's "poetical scale"
In the January 1758 edition of the Literary Magazine, an anonymous writer widely believed to be English poet and author Oliver Goldsmith presented a table comparing 29 English poets, rating them on a scale in each of four aspects of literary greatness. A score of 20 was literary perfection. Some of his estimations:

Some other poets Goldsmith placed on the scale: Michael Drayton, Lee, Aaron Hill, Nicholas Rowe, Garth, Southern and Hughes. John Donne was not listed, because, wrote Goldsmith, "Dr Donne was a man of wit, but he seems to have been at pains not to pass for a poet." (See also Mark Akenside's "Balance of Poets" of 1746.)

Births
Death years link to the corresponding "[year] in poetry" article:
 February 3
 Vasily Kapnist (died 1823), Ukrainian poet and playwright
 Valentin Vodnik (died 1819), Carniolan Slovene poet, writer and priest
 March 15 – Magdalene Sophie Buchholm (died 1825), Norwegian poet
 April 6 – Sir George Dallas, 1st Baronet (died 1833), English politician and poet
 April 30 – Jane West, born Iliffe, publishing under the pen names "Prudentia Homespun" and "Mrs. West" (died 1852), English novelist, poet, playwright and writer of conduct literature and educational tracts
 December – Mary Leadbeater (died 1826), Irish poet and writer
 Also:
 Ryōkan 良寛, born Eizō Yamamoto (died 1831), Japanese waka poet, calligrapher, Buddhist monk and often a hermit
 year uncertain – Joseph Fawcett (died 1804), English Presbyterian minister and poet

Deaths
Birth years link to the corresponding "[year] in poetry" article:
 January 1 – Johann Friedrich von Cronegk (born 1731), German dramatist, poet and essayist
 January 7 – Allan Ramsay (born 1686), Scottish poet
 July 15 – Ambrosius Stub (born 1705), Danish poet

See also

Poetry
List of years in poetry

Notes

18th-century poetry
Poetry